Joyce Dunsheath (8 November 1902 – 30 July 1976), née Cissie Providence Houchen, was an English mountaineer, traveller, explorer and writer.

Family 
Born in Heigham, near Norwich, she was the daughter of Charles Houchen, insurance clerk, and Gertrude Providence, née Balls. She married in 1938 the renowned electrical engineer Percy Dunsheath (1886–1979)  who was a widower. Joyce had met of his first wife  during a skiing holiday in the Austrian Alps. She and Percy shared a love for travel, mountaineering and exploration. They made their home at St Paul, Abinger Hammer, Surrey.

Education & awards 
She obtained a Degree in Modern Languages at Bedford College, University of London, in 1924. She was a member of the Alpine Club from 1951. In 1956 she was elected a Fellow of the Royal Geographical Society, serving in its council from 1965 to 1968. She also took a BSc degree when in her sixties, and an A-level Russian.

Climbing and exploration 
In 1956 she set off to explore the Himalayas in an expedition together with Eileen Gregory, biochemist, and Frances Delaney, geologist, and Hilda Reid, nurse. The target was the little known mountainous territory in the Kulu district of East Punjab. Driving all the way the 9000 miles from her home in Surrey, in a journey that was no less adventurous and perilous than the exploration itself, she managed to reach Manali, the "Darjeeling" of the Kulu district in seven weeks. Thanks to a grant of £500 from the Everest Foundation, she was able to survey thoroughly the Bara Shigri Glacier, by means of plane-table and panoramic camera, in order to compile subsequently a detailed map that took her detailed processing of her photographs and figures. In July 1957 she climbed the highest mountain in Europe, the 18,000 feet high, snow-capped Mount Elbrus, in the Caucasus region, walking through its western, central regions, and in Svanetia, Georgia. The whole area had been shut to the public since the Russian Revolution, and she was able to access it thanks to an invitation from the deputy Minister of Electric Power Stations, who had been in touch with her husband Percy about organizing an international electro-technical conference in Russia. 

In 1961, she climbed Mount Damavand in Afghanistan. The account of her journey and her companion Eleanor Baillie in this expedition can be read on her published book Afghan Quest (Harrap, 1961).

In 1964 she was invited by Bharat Scouts and Guides' Association to lead a team of six Indian women, aged between 18 and 31, to climb Mount Mrigthuni, 22,490 feet high, between the frontiers of Tibet and Nepal, in the Garhwal Himalayas. Following the successful ascent of Mount Everest by Sherpa Tensing in the team led by Sir John Hunt's in 1953, there was a very active interest in climbing in India, with climbing courses becoming very popular. The  expedition was successful, and "would make the path easier in all senses for future generations of Indian women".

She also climbed in the Japanese Alps, the Canadian Rockies, visited the Peruvian Andes in 1965, and in 1973 she added Mount Kilimanjaro and Mount Kenya to her list of successful climbs.

Publications 
Her accounts and memories can be found in her three published books, "Mountains and Memsahibs" 1956,  with the other members of the expedition to the Bara-Shigri glacier, Guest of the Soviets (1959),  and Afghan Quest (1961),  plus a number of articles in the Ladies Alpine Club Journal.

Legacy 
She was a paladin of a conception of mountaineering in its purest sense, free from professionalism and competition, and she petitioned passionately to promote her views. According to her, the right approach to it was to regard it as "a sport to be enjoyed ... to harden the body and learn the skills which will make for success ... each one matching her own strength against the strength of the mountain ... involving the whole man, physical, mental and spiritual ...  those gaining the summit know that the spirit of the hill is not of this world".

References

External links 
Joyce Dunsheath, "Mrigthuni", Himalayan Journal 26, 1965. Diary of the Mrigthuni climb and view a picture of the Indian team led by Dunsheath.

1902 births
1976 deaths
Alpine Club (UK)
Alumni of Bedford College, London
British women travel writers
English mountain climbers
English travel writers
Fellows of the Royal Geographical Society
Female climbers
People from Norwich